Southern California Military Academy (SCMA) was a private, all male military academy from 1924 to 1987, for both daily and resident students, located in Signal Hill, California at the corner of Cherry Avenue and 21st Street, In greater Long Beach, California. It had classes from kindergarten through 9th grades. The school was known for a highly educated teaching staff and a cadre of experienced former military officers. SCMA stressed high educational standards with military discipline and religious values. The school was not a facility for troubled students, but rather provided an advanced and diverse educational environment for those seeking greater achievement, while grooming them for future leadership.  The local hallmark of SCMA was its World War I field artillery pieces displayed out on Cherry Avenue in the then oil town of Signal Hill, overlooking the Port of Long Beach.

Noted alumni
 Ben Westlund - Oregon state senator and independent candidate for Oregon governor in 2006. 
 Marquez Pope - Businessman and former American professional football player.
 Roark Gourley - American painter, sculptor, and mixed media artist. He is best known for his 2.5 Dimensional wall sculptures that depict humorous subject matter.  He has been working in Laguna Beach, California, for over thirty years.
 Roy Choi - Chef of Kogi Truck Eateries. 
 Robert W, Hillman - Distinguished Professor of Law, University of California, Davis
 Bobby Burgess - One of the Original Mouseketeers and long featured dancer on the Lawrence Welk show.

References

External links 
The Cadets of Southern California Military Academy (SCMA) Facebook Group
Brown Military Academy Alumni website
TopoQuest topographic map

Education in Long Beach, California
Defunct United States military academies
Private elementary schools in California
Defunct schools in California
Private middle schools in California
1924 establishments in California